Buuraha Habeeno (also Habeeno, Habeno) is a mountain in the Cal Miskaad mountain range, Somalia.

See also
Mount Bahaya
Fadhisame

References

Populated places in Bari, Somalia
Bosaso
Mountain ranges of Somalia
Mountains of Somalia